Dywane Thomas Jr. (born August 6, 1990), professionally known as MonoNeon, is an American bassist,  experimental musician, singer and songwriter. His work, spanning multiple experimental projects and collaborations, including with American musician Prince, has seen an online cult following. Thomas was the last bassist Prince hired before his death in 2016, and he additionally played bass on American singer Ne-Yo song "Makin' A Movie" released in 2010. MonoNeon also played bass on Georgia Anne Muldrow's EP "Ms. One" (2014). He has since become known for his videos that harmonize viral videos with basslines, and his compositions that utilize microtonality. He is a native of Memphis, Tennessee.

Early life 
Thomas was raised in a musical family, the son of a bass guitarist. He began playing bass at the age of four years, independent of formal lessons (self-taught). When he was about 11 or 12 years old, he performed with Bar-Kays, playing bass guitar.

Education 
During his brief stay at Berklee College of Music he shared the stage with David Fiuczynski. After his departure from Berklee in 2010, Thomas went to Los Angeles to perform with Fiuczynski and Alex Bailey (drummer) at the Musicians Institute and The Baked Potato.

Professional background

Playing style 
While Thomas is right-handed, he plays left-handed on an upside down right-handed bass guitar, which allows him to use heavy string bending on the upper strings. Thomas' slapping style/technique is unique because he is executing everything upside-down, while traditionally using the thumb for slaps and fingers for pops. He also uses fingers and palm-muting to create what can be described as a warm, muffled timbre, as well as for maximum control of the length or sustain of notes. In a free/improvisational setting, listeners may hear the use of Indian melodic inflections and ornaments in Thomas' playing, including the use of gamakas. Another trademark is his use of randomness and mistakes in performance, taking unintentional ideas made in error, and spontaneously turning them into useable or intentional material. 

Thomas' overall playing style on bass can be described as "funky with unusual characteristics". Marcus Miller, among others, has praised his unique playing style. His musical background is heavily influenced by Southern soul, blues and funk. In a Bass Player magazine interview, Miller mentioned Thomas as one of several "young bad cats" he has met on the scene.

In 2009, Thomas was featured on the GospelChops Bass Sessionz Vol.1 project with Andrew Gouche, Hadrien Feraud, Damian Erskine, Janek Gwizdala, Anthony Nembhard, and Robert "Bubby" Lewis.
 
In 2010, Thomas played bass on the Libra Scale album by Grammy Award-winning artist Ne-Yo, and the album Directions by Forest Won with Georgia Anne Muldrow. Thomas was featured in the article, "Bass to the Future", in issue 52 of the UK Bass Guitar magazine.

In 2012, Thomas joined David Fiuczynski and Planet Microjam. Also in 2012, he released his solo avant-garde album, Down-to-Earth Art as MonoNeon.

MonoNeon's YouTube bass cover videos of Sonic The Hedgehog Green Hill Zone Theme and the theme song to the Martin Lawrence Show were featured on NoTreble.

In early 2013, Thomas released an album called Southern Visionary under the pseudonym MonoNeon. This album features several microtonal musicians. He also released an album entitled Uncle Curtis Answered The Lobster Telephone.

MonoNeon performed with 2010 Grammy nominee Sheri Jones-Moffett during the Recording Academy Chapter 40th Anniversary Celebration at Levitt Shell.

MonoNeon teamed up with producer Kriswontwo to release an EP called, WEON.

July 2014, MonoNeon made his debut performance as the bassist for Screaming Headless Torsos at Jalisco Jazz Festival in Mexico.

July 7, 2018, MonoNeon played a show with Joe Russo (musician) and Eric Krasno billed as (nO*sO*nO*).  While the three musicians have played together on many occasions in various other supergroup formations, this marked the first performance as a dedicated trio under this moniker. For most of the two-set performance, surprise guest keyboardist Peter Levin (Gregg Allman Band) played on several numbers. Relying heavily on improvisation, (nO*sO*nO*) dug deep into the funk, jazz, and psychedelic rock catalogs. Covers of Jimi Hendrix‘s “Manic Depression”, The Beatles‘ “Get Back”, Billy Cobham‘s “Stratus”, and John Scofield‘s “Hottentot”, appeared throughout the free-flowing jams and captivated the audience with their supersonic chemistry.

For the 65th Grammys MonoNeon has been Grammy nominated for his work on Cory Henry's album, "Operation Funk" (Best Progressive R&B Album nomination). MonoNeon is one of the writers, guitarist and bassist on the songs "Ecstasy" and "The Line".

Experimental works 
Thomas' experimental approach has been compared to the 20th century composer John Cage . The idea of conceptual art plays a role in his musical compositions, as reflected in his early 2011 recordings. Thomas began developing an idea of bass accompanying improvisations with an AM/FM radio. The improvisations/compositions are based on radio art, some of which can be heard on his album entitled Introspection of PolyNeon. The "Polyneon" concept is something Thomas created through introspection and when he stopped thinking about the goal of becoming or being a great musician.

Thomas is notable for his "readymade bass", inspired by his love for Dadaism and other avant garde art movements. The primary characteristics of the "readymade bass" is the ordinary sock covering the entire headstock and the name "Polyneon" on the body of his bass. The use of colorful duct tape and other mundane items upon his basses has become a defining visual style for Thomas.

MonoNeon was featured in the January/February 2013 issue of Dig! Magazine, a Winnipeg jazz magazine.

MonoNeon's microtonal works and art manifesto were mentioned on The Rest Is Noise, a website by Alex Ross, a music critic who regularly writes for The New Yorker.

One of MonoNeon's bass cover videos performing KNOWER's arrangement/medley of Lady Gaga songs was voted Top 10 most watched video on NoTreble (March 2014).

A microtonal bass built for MonoNeon by Tim Cloonan of CallowHill Guitars was featured on NoTreble as Bass of the Week. The bass is built to play quarter tones.

In 2021 MonoNeon teamed up with Davy Nathan and released "Supermane", a full length album featuring 8 tracks. The track "Done with the B-S", a duet with MonoNeon and Ledisi was featured in Rolling Stone magazine. 
The album was produced, written and recorded in Nathan's studio in Los Angeles. They describe the album as a step outside of the vocal comfort zone of MonoNeon.

Working with Prince 
In 2015 MonoNeon began playing bass with Prince and his protégé, Judith Hill. Some of the live shows have been at Paisley Park.

On 11 January 2016, Tidal released the track Ruff Enuff by MonoNeon, only four and a half days after its initial recording. The instrumental track features Prince as producer and on keyboards. The following day, the track was replaced with a vocal version with lead vocals on vocoder by Adrian Crutchfield.

The linernotes provided with the track state:

When Prince wasn't playing his solo piano shows, he was breaking in a new band at Paisley Park with MonoNeon as his new bassist.

Discography

Solo albums 
 "Polyneon" (2010)
 "Introspection of PolyNeon" (2011)
 "Noise Catharsis" (2011)
 "Johnnie Taylor and John Cage" (2011)
 "The Kitschy EP" (2011)
 "MonoNeon" (2012)
 "Ming Neon" (2012)
 "Down-to-Earth Art" (2012)
 "Southern Visionary" (2013)
 "Uncle Curtis Answered The Lobster Telephone" (2013)
 "John Cage on Soul Train" (2014)
 "MonoNeon Plays Speech" (2015)
 "Selfie Quickie" (2015)
 "Selfie Quickie 2wooo" (2017)
 "Welcome 2 Whateva The Fyuck" (2017) 
A Place Called Fantasy (2017) 
 "I Don't Care Today (Angels & Demons in Lo-Fi)" (2018)
 "My Feelings Be Peeling" (2019)
 "Living The Best And Worst Life At The Same Damn Time!" (2019)
 "Toxic Wasteland 2 The Hills" (2020)
 "Banana Peel on Capitol Hill" (2021)
 "Gospel According to the Little Green Man - EP" (2021)
 "Supermane" (2021)
 "Basquiat & Skittles Album" (2021)
 "Put on Earth for You " (2022)

With Ne-Yo 
 "Libra Scale" (2010)
Bass on "Making A Movie"

With Georgia Anne Muldrow 
 "Ms. One" (2014)

With Prince 
 "RUFF ENUFF" single (2016)

With WEON 
 "WEON" (2013)
 "Neon the Won" (2015)

With Mac Miller 
 Circles (2020)
MonoNeon played bass on the song, "Complicated"

With Nas 
 King's Disease
Bass on "All Bad" and credited as 'MnoNeon' for additional producer

References 

1990 births
Living people
American noise musicians
21st-century African-American male singers
American experimental musicians
People from Memphis, Tennessee
Berklee College of Music alumni
Guitarists from Tennessee
American male bass guitarists
21st-century American bass guitarists
21st-century American male musicians
African-American guitarists